= Warren Burton (writer) =

American clergyman (1800–1866)

Warren B. Burton (November 23, 1800 – June 6, 1866) was an American clergyman and writer who wrote on phrenology, transcendentalism, and education.
